The William R. Moore Dry Goods Building is a historic building in Memphis, Tennessee, U.S.. It was built in 1913 for the William R. Moore Dry Goods company, founded in 1859, and designed by prominent Memphis architect Charles O. Pfeil. It has been listed on the National Register of Historic Places since August 26, 1982.

References

Buildings and structures on the National Register of Historic Places in Tennessee
Chicago school architecture in the United States
Buildings and structures completed in 1913
Buildings and structures in Memphis, Tennessee